The Bagatelles, Op. 47 (B. 79) are five bagatelles for two violins, cello, and harmonium written by Antonin Dvorak.

References

External links
 

1878 compositions
Compositions by Antonín Dvořák